Jonathan Fawkner is a visual effects artist.

He was nominated at the 87th Academy Awards, the 90th Academy Awards and the 94th Academy Awards in the Best Visual Effects category for his work on the films Guardians of the Galaxy, Guardians of the Galaxy Vol. 2 and No Time to Die.

References

External links

Living people
Special effects people
Place of birth missing (living people)
1973 births